Francisco is an 'L' station on the CTA's Brown Line. It is an at-grade station with a single island platform, located in Chicago's Ravenswood Manor neighborhood at 4649 North Francisco Avenue. The adjacent stations are Kedzie, which is about one third of a mile (0.536 km) to the west, and Rockwell, located across the Chicago River about three eighths of a mile (0.6 km) to the east.

History
Francisco Station opened on December 14, 1907, as part of Northwestern Elevated Railroad's Ravenswood line. It had survived relatively intact until September 2006, when the station closed for renovation.

Brown Line Capacity Expansion Project
The Brown Line Capacity Expansion Project aims to allow eight car trains on the Brown Line by the extension of the platforms at all stations. At the same time all Brown Line stations are being upgraded to meet ADA requirements. Because of the historic nature of the station structures, Francisco Station was not completely rebuilt, as with the neighboring Kedzie and Rockwell stations. However, the platforms were rebuilt, an auxiliary entrance added on Sacramento Avenue, and the station house and canopy were renovated and upgraded. The station closed from September 15, 2006, to March 9, 2007, to allow this work to be completed.

Gallery

Notes and references

Notes

References

External links 

 Train schedule (PDF) at CTA official site
 Sacramento Avenue entrance from Google Maps Street View
 Francisco Avenue entrance from Google Maps Street View

CTA Brown Line stations
Railway stations in the United States opened in 1907